Synchiropus minutulus, the minute flagfin dragonet, is a species of fish in the family Callionymidae, the dragonets. It is found in the Western Indian Ocean.

Etymology
The fishes name means very small or pygmy.

References

minutulus
Taxa named by Ronald Fricke
Fish described in 1981